The Angolan Roller Hockey SuperCup aka Supertaça João Garcia is an annual handball competition between the winners of the previous year's league champion and cup. In case the same team happens to win both the league and the cup, the match will be played between the league winner and the cup runner-up.

Scores

Titles by team

See also
 Angola Roller Hockey Cup
 Angolan Roller Hockey League
 Supertaça de Angola (football)
 Supertaça de Angola (basketball)
 Supertaça de Angola (handball)

References

Roller hockey competitions in Angola
2005 establishments in Angola